Bowokan Islands (also Treko Islands, Kepulauan Bowokan or Treko) is the southern group of smaller islands within Banggai Islands chain of Banggai Regency of Central Sulawesi. The largest island is named Bowokan Island.  Salue Timpaus Strait is to the east, and Gulf of Tolo to the West.

Archipelagoes of Indonesia
Uninhabited islands of Indonesia